Bondevik is a Norwegian surname. Bondevik may refer to

People
Borghild Bondevik Haga (1906–1990) Norwegian politician for the Liberal Party
Gunnar Bondevik (1902–1987), Norwegian priest
Jarle Bondevik (1934–2016), Norwegian philologist
Kjell Magne Bondevik (born 1947), Norwegian Lutheran minister and politician
Kjell Bondevik (1901–1983), Norwegian politician for the Christian Democratic Party
Odd Bondevik (1941–2014), Norwegian minister and Bishop of Møre in the Church of Norway

Other
Bondevik's Second Cabinet, governed Norway between 19 October 2001 and 17 October 2005.
Bondevik's First Cabinet,  governed Norway between 17 October 1997 to 3 March 2000.

Surnames
Norwegian-language surnames